SuperMelodrama is the first album by the band DeVotchKa. It was released by Dago Records in 2000. It was recorded partly at Absinthe Studios, in Westminster, Colorado.

Critical reception
AllMusic wrote that the band mixes "regular references to European folk, hints of sunny pop melodies, and angular post-punk ruminations via a mesh of clarinet, accordion, sousaphone, trumpet, percussion, and violin falling over the staggering peaks of the traditional rock & roll bed of guitar, bass, and drums." Global Rhythm praised the "raucous surf-gypsy leanings."

Members
DeVotchka had a different line up of members for the first album. Only Urata and Hagerman continued.

 Nick Urata – Vocals, guitars, trumpet
 Tom Echols – Cello, guitars, Vocals
 Tom Hagerman – Violin
 David Rastatter – Drums, percussion
 Sweet Johnny V – Bass, accordion
 Young Sam Young – Drums
 Steve Pang – Double Bass
 Michael Crow – Banjo, Jewsharp

Track listing
 "Danglin' Feet" – 2:24
 "DeVotchKa!" - 2:58
 "Gasoline Serpent" – 3:03
 "Head Honcho" – 3:11
 "Dark Eyes" – 2:47
 "Whiskey Breath" – 2:45
 "Sunrise on Cicero" – 3:14
 "Cuba Libra" – 2:05
 "The Jaws of the World"  – 2:49
 "Life Is Short" – 3:28
 "Tragedy" – 3:31
 "Curse Your Little Heart" – 2:55
 "In the Tower" – 2:26

References

External links
Band's official site

2000 debut albums
DeVotchKa albums